Duchess Marie Elisabeth of Schleswig-Holstein-Gottorp (21 March 1678 – 17 July 1755) was Princess-Abbess of Quedlinburg from 1718 until her death. 

Duchess Marie Elisabeth was born in Hamburg as the youngest child of Christian Albert, Duke of Holstein-Gottorp, and his wife, Princess Frederica Amalia of Denmark. She was considered for marriage to Charles XII of Sweden, but he declined. 

In 1718, she was elected Princess-Abbess of Quedlinburg. However, the Kings in Prussia, who obtained the guardianship of the abbey-principality as electors of Brandenburg in 1698, tried to impose their authority over this small state of the Holy Roman Empire by attempting to influence the election of new princess-abbess in favour of their own relatives. Marie Elisabeth was elected several times during the interregnum, while the abbey-principality was ruled by the provost Maria Aurora von Königsmarck, but King Frederick William I of Prussia refused to consent to each election and Holy Roman Emperor Charles VI consequently refused to confirm the elections. The election, however, eventually went ahead but  the selection of a duchess of Schleswig-Holstein-Gottorp instead than a princess of Prussia caused quite a stir. Due to her territorial disputes with the King in Prussia, Marie Elisabeth turned to the Holy Roman Emperor, but without success.

As the ruler, Princess-Abbess Marie Elisabeth restored the castle, the abbey and the Abbey Church of St. Servatius, where she was buried upon her death in Quedlinburg. After her death, a princess of Prussia was finally elected and Marie Elisabeth was succeeded by Princess Anna Amalia of Prussia.

Ancestry

Bibliography

 H. Lorenz: Werdegang von Stift und Stadt Quedlinburg. Quedlinburg 1922.

External links 
 guide2womenleaders

|-

Abbesses of Quedlinburg
Lutheran abbesses
House of Holstein-Gottorp
1678 births
1755 deaths
18th-century women rulers
Daughters of monarchs